This is a List of fountains in Bucharest.

Fountains
Bucharest